Yardie is a term used in specific contexts for people of Jamaican origin.

Yardie may also refer to:
 Yardie (film), a 2018 British film
 Yardie (novel), a 1992 novel by Victor Headly
 a yard of ale

Yardi may refer to:
 Ashvini Yardi, producer of Bollywood films
 Sachin Yardi, Hindi film director

See also 
 Yardy, a surname (including a list of people with the name)
 Jardi (disambiguation)